NGC 4267 is a barred lenticular galaxy located about 55 million light-years away in the constellation Virgo. It was discovered by astronomer William Herschel on April 17, 1784 and is a member of the Virgo Cluster.

See also
 List of NGC objects (4001–5000)
 NGC 4262
 NGC 4340
 NGC 4477

References

External links
 

4267
39710
Virgo (constellation)
Virgo Cluster
Astronomical objects discovered in 1784
Barred lenticular galaxies
7373